Saint-Blancard (Gascon: Sent Blancat) is a commune in the Gers department in the Occitanie region in southwestern France.

Geography

Localisation 
Saint-Blancard is located on the ridge between the valley of the Gimone in the east and the valley of  the Arrats in the west . The D228 crosses the D576 in the village.
Auch is at 40 km, Toulouse at 80 km and Tarbes at 60 km from Saint-Blancard.

Hydrography 
The Arrats runs in the west of the commune.

South of the village is a small lake for the farmers.

There is a  privately owned  watermill. To the southeast lies a 6 km long reservoir with a surface area of 263 hectares, Lac de la Gimone. The lake forms the border between Gers and Haute-Garonne. It was created by the placement of a dam on the river Gimone. The commune has a system of streams and small lakes that serve the agriculture.

History

Politics 
The office of nine communes united under the name Les Hautes Vallees, is located in the village.

Population

The inhabitants are called Saint Blancardais.

Services
With a small shop, the village is still self-supporting. At the store is a gas depot. There is a hairdresser and a post office in Saint-Blancard. The municipality encourages the middle class by counting low rents for buildings. In a former convent school is now a hotel / pub / restaurant next to the town hall. There is a school. There are Bed & Breakfast and there are cottages. There is a football field. At the lake is a nautical center. There is a swimming facility. There is a field for motorized paragliding.

The village has a rehabilitation center. There are also homes for rehabilitation treatment.

Sites of interest 

The most striking building in town is the castle. The 15th-century church Saint-Pancrare is built next to the castle. In a pasture north of the castle stand on a hill, the remains of the windmill (moulin à vent fr) from Saint-Blancard. That place is called Chez Baptiste. In front of the castle is a monument to the fallen, a cross and a statue of Mary. Between these statues is a boules alley with lights located.

In the middle of the village stands a cross aging from 1895 in memory of the famille (family) Furgatte. In the east of the village stands a twelve-foot-high wooden cross back from the seventeenth century.

Notable people 
In the village is the Château de Saint-Blancard (Castle of Saint-Blancard). Among the barons and marquesses that lived in the castle were: 
 Bernard d'Ornezan, Baron of Saint-Blancard in the diocese of Lombez, around 1400,
 and Armand de Gontaut, baron de Biron and Maréchal de camp, mid sixteenth century.

See also

Communes of the Gers department

References

Communes of Gers